Zsolt Erőss (March 7, 1968 – May 21, 2013) was the most successful Hungarian high-altitude mountaineer, summiting 10 out of the 14 eight-thousanders. He was also the first Hungarian citizen to have climbed Mount Everest.

In 2010, he lost his right leg in an avalanche accident, requiring amputation below the knee. Soon after his recovery he returned to mountaineering, trying to summit the Cho Oyu in fall 2010. The expedition did not reach the top due to bad weather conditions, but later in May 2011 he successfully summited the Lhotse. After successfully scaling Kangchenjunga on May 20, 2013, he went missing in descent. Search missions were suspended on May 22. According to the expedition's leader and other experienced mountaineers, his survival is impossible.

Life
He was born in Miercurea Ciuc (Csíkszereda), a town in Transylvania, Romania. He started mountain climbing in 1981 and climbed several Transylvanian mountains. He moved to Hungary in 1988 with his mother and brother, and became a Hungarian citizen in 1992. From 1989 he worked as an industrial alpinist. His first climb as the member of an expedition was in 1990 at the Elbrus. Afterward he climbed Pamir, Aconcagua and Kilimanjaro among others listed below. He was the member of the first and second Hungarian Mount Everest Expedition in 1996 and 2001, respectively, but couldn't reach the peak.

In 2002, he succeeded in climbing the Mount Everest as the first Hungarian citizen and second Hungarian overall (the first was Czechoslovak citizen Zoltán Demján in 1984). He was awarded the Order of Merit of the Hungarian Republic with the Officers' Cross. In early 2010 he suffered an accident in the Tatra mountains, which led to his right leg being amputated below the knee. He returned to climbing the same year using a prosthetic leg. Until his disappearance he climbed ten of the world's eight-thousanders, the last two with prosthetic leg.

Disappearance
On May 20, 2013, 18:00 he successfully summited Kangchenjunga together with his climbing partner, 26-year-old Péter Kiss. During the descent Erőss reported feeling weak and showed signs of exhaustion, falling behind the rest of the summiteers. He spent the night presumably alone in the death zone, but in the morning he was joined by Kiss, who in a highly unusual move climbed back up to help his partner, as reported around 9 am. They were seen descending slowly towards Camp 4, situated at 7600 m, but soon after Kiss fell and disappeared. Erőss' condition deteriorated rapidly, reporting vision problems, being unaware of Kiss' whereabouts and finally speaking incoherently. He sat down and slept a few hours, after which around 3:00 pm he reported feeling better and seemed to get back his strength to start moving down to Camp 4. Along the way he went missing, and was never seen again. Members of a Korean expedition, who also lost one of their members, attempted to search for both Erőss and Kiss but only Kiss' body could be spotted.

On May 22, it was announced that the search for the climbers had been abandoned. However, his body was seen in 2014 on the ramp at 8100 m and its identity was confirmed.

Climbed Eight-thousanders
1999 - Nanga Parbat 8126 m in a new route (solo climb of the Mummery Rib, the glacier that lies between Ganalo Peak and Nanga Parbat)
2002 - Everest 8848 m
2003 - Gasherbrum II 8035 m
2006 - Dhaulagiri 8167 m
2007 - Hidden Peak 8068 m
2007 - Broad Peak 8047 m
2008 - Makalu 8481 m
2009 - Manaslu 8156 m
2011 - Lhotse 8516 m (with prosthetic leg)
2013 - Kangchenjunga 8586 m (with prosthetic leg)

See also
List of solved missing person cases
List of unsolved deaths

Other notable climbs
1990 - Elbrus 5642 m 
1991 - Khan Tengri 6995 m, Pobeda peak 7439 m
1993 - Lenin Peak 7134 m
1994 - Pik 4 in Pamir Mountains  6400 m, Korzhenevskaya 7105 m, Communism Peak 7495 m, unnamed peak at 6200 m in Pamir, Tajikistan
1995 - attempt: Ogre (reached 7000 m)
1996 - 2 attempts for Everest (reached 8300 m)
1997 - south face of Satopanth until 7050 m
1999 - Ganalo Peak 6606 m
2000 - Distaghil Sar 7885 m, in new route
2001 - Aconcagua 6960 m
2003 - attempt for Hidden Peak in a new route (reached 8000 m)
2004 - Kilimanjaro 5895 m
2005 - attempt: K2 (reached 8300 m)
2010 - attempt: Cho-Oyu (reached 7100 m, with prosthetic leg)
2012 - attempt: Annapurna I (reached 7400 m, with prosthetic leg)

References

Sources

External links

 Facebook news about actual expeditions
 Official web page

1968 births
2010s missing person cases
2013 deaths
Formerly missing people
Hungarian mountain climbers
Missing person cases in India
Mountaineering deaths
Sportspeople from Miercurea Ciuc
Summiters of Mount Everest
Unsolved deaths